In algebraic geometry a generalized Jacobian is a commutative algebraic group associated to a curve with a divisor, generalizing the Jacobian variety of a complete curve. Generalized Jacobians of a curve are extensions of the Jacobian of the curve by a commutative affine algebraic group, giving nontrivial examples of Chevalley's structure theorem.

Definition

Suppose C is a complete nonsingular curve, m an effective divisor on C, S is the support of m, and P is a fixed base point on C not in S. The generalized Jacobian Jm is a commutative algebraic group with a rational map f from C to Jm such that:
f takes P to the identity of  Jm.
f is regular outside S.
f(D) = 0 whenever D is the divisor of a rational function g on C such that g≡1 mod m. 
Moreover Jm is the universal group with these properties, in the sense that any rational map from C to a group with the properties above factors uniquely through Jm. The group Jm does not depend on the choice of base point P, though changing P changes that map f by a translation.

Structure of the generalized Jacobian

For m=0 the generalized Jacobian Jm is just the usual Jacobian J, an abelian variety of dimension g, the genus of C.

For m a nonzero effective divisor the generalized Jacobian is an extension of J by a connected commutative affine algebraic group Lm of dimension deg(m)−1. So we have an exact sequence
0 → Lm → Jm → J → 0

The group Lm is a quotient
0 → Gm → ΠUPi(ni) → Lm → 0
of a product of groups Ri by the multiplicative group Gm of the underlying field. The product runs over the points Pi in the support of m, and the group UPi(ni) is the group of invertible elements of the local ring modulo those that are 1 mod Pini.  The group UPi(ni) has dimension ni, the number of times Pi occurs in m. It is the product of the multiplicative  group Gm by a unipotent group of dimension ni−1, which in characteristic 0 is isomorphic to a product of ni−1 additive groups.

Complex generalized Jacobians

Over the complex numbers, the algebraic structure of the generalized Jacobian determines an analytic structure of the generalized Jacobian making it a complex Lie group.

The analytic subgroup underlying the generalized Jacobian can be described as follows. (This does not always determine the algebraic structure as two non-isomorphic commutative algebraic groups may be isomorphic as analytic groups.) Suppose that C is a curve with an effective divisor m with support S.   There is a natural map from the homology group H1(C − S) to the dual Ω(−m)* of the complex vector space Ω(−m) (1-forms with poles on m) induced by the integral of a 1-form over a 1-cycle. The analytic generalized Jacobian is then the quotient group Ω(−m)*/H1(C − S).

References

Algebraic groups
Algebraic curves